Leonard Barr (born Leonard Barra; September 27, 1903 – November 22, 1980) was an American stand-up comedian, film actor, and dancer. 

Barr appeared several times with Dean Martin (his nephew) and Jerry Lewis when they hosted the Colgate Comedy Hour. He had a brief role in The Sting, appropriately as a burlesque comic. That is also the way his character is listed in the credits—as an anonymous comedian. However, in the wings of the stage just before the comic's entrance, he has a brief conversation with Johnny Hooker (Robert Redford), who addresses him as "Leonard". Barr's comedic schtick was one-liners; told with a straight face, and sometimes deliberately repeating a punchline.

He is perhaps best remembered internationally for his appearance in the 1971 James Bond film Diamonds Are Forever in which he played Shady Tree, a stand-up comedian and smuggler in Las Vegas who was assassinated by henchmen Mr. Wint and Mr. Kidd. He also appeared in The Odd Couple in the non-dialogue New York street scenes in the first season and in later episodes with dialogue; and, albeit unnamed, on an episode of M*A*S*H as a USO comedian. He also made numerous guest appearances on The Tonight Show Starring Johnny Carson; as well as his nephew's own variety show. Cameron Crowe briefly depicted Barr as a foul-mouthed real-life character in Almost Famous, his semi-autobiographical film of 2000.

Personal life
He was the uncle of Dean Martin (being the brother of Dean Martin's mother Angela).

Death
Barr died in Burbank, California at age 77 on November 22, 1980 after suffering  a stroke three weeks earlier.

Filmography

References

External links
 
 

American stand-up comedians
American male film actors
American people of Italian descent
1903 births
1980 deaths
20th-century American male actors
20th-century American comedians